The Grudge is a 2004 supernatural horror film directed by Takashi Shimizu, written by Stephen Susco, and produced by Sam Raimi, Robert Tapert, and Takashige Ichise. A remake of Shimizu's 2002 Japanese horror film Ju-On: The Grudge, it stars Sarah Michelle Gellar, Jason Behr, KaDee Strickland, Clea DuVall, and Bill Pullman, and is the first installment in The Grudge film series, which is based on the Japanese Ju-On films. Takako Fuji, Yuya Ozeki, and Takashi Matsuyama portray the characters Kayako Saeki, Toshio Saeki, and Takeo Saeki from the original films. The plot is told through a nonlinear sequence of events and includes several intersecting subplots.

After the success of American remake The Ring (2002), Sony Pictures had green-lit an American remake of Ju-On: The Grudge. Shimizu, the writer and director of the original film, was hired to direct the film from a screenplay written by Susco. Principal photography on the film began on January 26, 2004 and wrapped in July 2004 in Tokyo, Japan.

The Grudge was released in North America on October 22, 2004, by Columbia Pictures. The film grossed $187 million against a $10 million budget and received mixed reviews from critics, who found it illogical and barely scary. In its opening weekend, the film grossed $39 million, becoming the first horror film since House on Haunted Hill (1999) to top the Halloween box office and, until the Friday the 13th remake in 2009, had the highest grossing opening weekend for a horror remake.

The film was followed by two sequels, theatrically-released The Grudge 2 (2006) and straight-to-video The Grudge 3 (2009). A reboot, also entitled The Grudge (2020), takes place concurrently with the events of this film and its two sequels.

Plot
The Grudge describes a curse that is born when someone dies in the grip of extreme rage or sorrow, created where the person died. Those who encounter the curse die, and the curse is reborn repeatedly, passing from victim to victim in an endless, growing chain of horror. The following events are explained in their actual order, however, the film is presented in a nonlinear narrative.

In 2001, Kayako Saeki, a housewife living in suburban Tokyo, is in love with college professor Peter Kirk, obsessively writing about him in a diary. Her husband Takeo becomes jealous as he discovers the diary and believes that Kayako is having an affair with another man. Takeo brutally murders her, and their young son Toshio for walking in on the murder, and the pet cat Mar in a fit of rage. After Takeo hides the bodies in the house, Kayako's ghost hangs him with her hair.

After receiving a letter from Kayako, Peter visits the Saeki house only to find both her and Takeo's corpses along with Toshio's ghost. Shocked and horrified, he flees the scene and commits suicide the next day. The remainder of the Saeki family rise again as ghosts due to the curse, notably Kayako, who appears as an onryō.

In 2004, the Williams family from America move into the Saeki house. While Matt is thrilled with the house, his wife Jennifer and dementia-ridden mother Emma feel uncomfortable. Matt and Jennifer are quickly consumed by the curse. Yoko, a care worker, arrives at the house to find Emma alone before she encounters Kayako, who drags her up into the attic.

Concerned about Yoko's disappearance, her employer Alex sends another care worker, Karen Davis, to take over the care of Emma. At the house, Karen discovers Toshio sealed up in a wardrobe and later on witnesses Kayako's spirit descending from the ceilings to claim Emma.

Alex arrives at the house shortly after and finds Emma dead and Karen in a state of shock. Alex calls the police, with the presence of Detective Nakagawa. In the attic, Nakagawa and his partner Igarashi find Matt and Jennifer's bodies, along with a human's lower jaw. Meanwhile, Matt's sister, Susan, is pursued by Kayako around her office building. At home, Kayako attacks her and she vanishes. While leaving work, Alex is killed by Yoko's jawless corpse.
 
Kayako begins haunting Karen, who informs her boyfriend Doug of the situation. Karen researches the house, eventually confronting Nakagawa, who explains that three of his colleagues investigating the Saeki deaths were all consumed by the curse. That night, Nakagawa carries gasoline into the house in an attempt to burn it down, but is killed by Takeo. After learning that Doug has ventured to the Saeki house to look for her, Karen races there. She finds Doug paralyzed and attempts to flee with him. Kayako crawls down the stairs and latches onto Doug, who dies of shock. As Kayako closes in, Karen sees the gasoline and ignites it.

Karen survives and in the hospital, she learns that the house also survived the fire. Visiting Doug's body, Karen realizes that she is still haunted by Kayako.

Cast

 Sarah Michelle Gellar as Karen Davis, an exchange student
 Jason Behr as Doug McCarthy, Karen's boyfriend, who attends the University of Tokyo and works at a local Tokyo restaurant as a waiter to make ends meet.
 KaDee Strickland as Susan Williams, Matt's younger sister and a businesswoman who he joins in Tokyo along with his wife and mother. 
 William Mapother as Matthew "Matt" Williams, who relocates to Tokyo for a promotion
 Clea DuVall as Jennifer "Jen" Williams, Matt's wife
 Grace Zabriskie as Emma Williams, Matt and Susan's mother and Jennifer's mother-in-law who has severe lethargy with mild dementia.
 Bill Pullman as Peter Kirk, a college professor working in Tokyo and Kayako's secret love and obsession.
 Rosa Blasi as Maria Kirk, Peter's wife
 Ted Raimi as Alex Jones, the director of the care center where Yoko and Karen are stationed
 Ryo Ishibashi as Det. Hideto Nakagawa, a Japanese detective who covered the murders at the Saeki Family House with his partners.
 Yōko Maki as Yoko Sekine, a Japanese care worker assigned to care for Emma Williams
 Takako Fuji as Kayako Saeki, a married woman who is attracted to Peter Kirk.
 Yuya Ozeki as Toshio Saeki, Kayako and Takeo Saeki's 7-year-old son.
 Takashi Matsuyama as Takeo Saeki, Kayako's husband and Toshio's father.

Production
In late 2002, the unexpected success of the English-language remake of The Ring finally gave Sony Pictures confidence to green-light an English-language remake of Ju-On: The Grudge. That same day, Takashi Shimizu, the director and creator of the original film, was hired to direct the film, with Stephen Susco writing the screenplay, and Sam Raimi through its Ghost House Pictures banner producing the project, alongside Robert Tapert and Takashige Ichise. Shimizu was eager to work on a remake of his own film, as he saw it as an opportunity to improve and fix some of the perceived problems and flaws that were present in the original film.

Principal photography on the film began on January 26, 2004, with reshoots occurring in July 2004 in Tokyo, Japan. Sarah Michelle Gellar filmed her scenes in Tokyo within three months before returning for the reshoots.

Release
The Grudge was theatrically released in the United States on October 22, 2004, by Columbia Pictures, to coincide with Halloween.

Box office
The Grudge opened at 3,348 theaters in North America. The film generated $39.1 million in ticket sales in its first weekend (October 22–24, 2004). Ticket sales declined 43% on the second weekend, earning $21.8 million, thereby becoming the first horror film to top the Halloween box office since House on Haunted Hill.

The film made US$110.4 million in North America and a total of $187.3 million worldwide, far exceeding the expectations of box-office analysts and Sony Pictures executives. Sony also stated production costs of less than $10 million, making it one of the most profitable movies of the year.

The film is recognized as the second-highest grossing horror remake of the past 40 years behind The Ring (2002), but in front of others such as A Nightmare on Elm Street (2010), Friday the 13th (2009), and One Missed Call (2008). It is also second in Japanese remakes, again behind The Ring, but seventh in highest openings for an October release, being beaten by family movies.

Critical reception

The review aggregator website Rotten Tomatoes reports that 40% of 162 critics have given the film a positive review, with an average rating of 5.11/10. The site's critics consensus reads, "There's some creepy imagery to be found, but not much in the way of logic or truly jarring scares." On Metacritic, the film has a weighted average of 49 out of 100 based on 32 reviews, indicating "mixed or average reviews". 

Roger Ebert gave a mostly negative review, awarding the film 1 star out of 4, writing "I'm not sure how most of the scenes fit into the movie. I do, however, understand the underlying premise: There is a haunted house, and everybody who enters it will have unspeakable things happen to them." He criticized the fragmented time structure and said he "eventually lost all patience". Brian Rentschler of Screen Rant gave an overall positive review but in the end, unfavorably compared the film to The Ring, writing: "Writer/director Takashi Shimizu (who also wrote and directed the original) does a decent job of setting the mood of the film and (to a lesser extent) developing the storyline, but to be so similar to a movie that came out only two years ago... it's a tough obstacle to overcome."

Home media
The Grudge was released on VHS, DVD, and UMD on February 1, 2005, as a standard version of the film with only a few special features. On May 17, 2005, the unrated director's cut of The Grudge was released on DVD in North America. The release included several scenes that were cut to achieve a lower rating from the MPAA. This version of the film was used as the theatrical run in Japan. The release also contained new deleted scenes and commentaries, director Takashi Shimizu's original Ju-On short films, Katasumi and 4444444444, and more. The film was released on Blu-ray Disc in the US on May 12, 2009, the same day that The Grudge 3 was released on DVD. It was made available to purchase on iTunes in 2008.

The film made $9.24 million from DVD sales in its first week, debuting at number two in the sales chart behind Ray.

References

External links
 
 
 
 
 Director Takashi Shimizu Q&A

2004 films
2000s supernatural films
American ghost films
Columbia Pictures films
2004 horror films
2000s horror thriller films
Films directed by Takashi Shimizu
Films produced by Sam Raimi
American supernatural horror films
Ghost House Pictures films
Horror film remakes
Films about curses
Films set in 2004
Films set in Tokyo
Films shot in Tokyo
2000s ghost films
American haunted house films
American nonlinear narrative films
American remakes of Japanese films
Uxoricide in fiction
Filicide in fiction
Mariticide in fiction
Films scored by Christopher Young
Films with screenplays by Stephen Susco
Asian-American horror films
The Grudge (film series)
Films set in the 2000s
Japan in non-Japanese culture
2000s English-language films
2000s American films